James Douglas may refer to:

Scottish noblemen

Lords of Angus
 James Douglas, 3rd Earl of Angus (1426–1446), Scottish nobleman
 James Douglas, Earl of Angus (1671–1692), son of the 2nd Marquess of Douglas

Lords of Douglas
 James Douglas, Lord of Douglas (1286–1330), ("the Good", "the Black"), Scottish warlord and champion of Robert the Bruce
 James Douglas, 2nd Earl of Douglas (c. 1358–1388)
 James Douglas, 7th Earl of Douglas (1371–1443), "the Gross"
 James Douglas, 9th Earl of Douglas (1426–1488), Scottish nobleman
 Lord James Douglas (1617–1645), son of the 1st Marquess of Douglas
 James Douglas, 2nd Marquess of Douglas (1646–1700)

Lords of Morton
 James Douglas, 1st Earl of Morton (1426–1493)
 James Douglas, 3rd Earl of Morton (died 1548)
 James Douglas, 4th Earl of Morton (c. 1516–1581)
 James Douglas, 10th Earl of Morton (died 1686), Earl of Morton
 James Douglas, 11th Earl of Morton (died 1715), Earl of Morton
 James Douglas, 14th Earl of Morton (1702–1768), Scottish astronomer and peer

Elsewhere
 James Douglas, 2nd Earl of Queensberry (died 1671)
 James Douglas, 4th Duke of Hamilton (1658–1712)
 James Douglas, 2nd Duke of Queensberry (1662–1711), also 1st Duke of Dover
 James Douglas, 3rd Marquess of Queensberry (1697–1715), lunatic and cannibal
 James Douglas-Hamilton, Baron Selkirk of Douglas (born 1942), former MP and MSP, also briefly 11th Earl of Selkirk
 James Douglas, 1st Lord Mordington (died 1656)
 James Douglas, 3rd Lord Mordington (1651–?)
 James Douglas, 7th Baron Drumlanrig (died 1578), Scottish nobleman
 James Douglas, 1st Lord Dalkeith, Scottish nobleman
 James Douglas, 4th Baron Douglas (1787–1857)

Politicians
 James Douglas Stoddart Douglas (1793–1875), MP for Rochester
 James Douglas (died 1751), British Member of Parliament for Malmesbury and St. Mawes
 James Lester Douglas (1881–1950), Canadian member of Parliament for Queen's, Prince Edward Island
 James McCrie Douglas (1867–1950), politician in Alberta, Canada and former mayor of Edmonton
 James Moffat Douglas (1839–1920), Canadian member of Parliament and Senator from Saskatchewan
 James G. Douglas (1887–1954), supporter of Michael Collins, architect of Irish Free State Constitution, member of Irish Senate
 Jim Douglas (born 1951), governor of Vermont
 Sir James Douglas (governor) (1803–1877), governor of Vancouver Island and British Columbia; head of Hudson's Bay Company operations in the Columbia District
 James Douglas (British Army officer) (1785–1862), British Army officer and Lieutenant Governor of Guernsey
 James Robson Douglas (1876–1934), Lieutenant Governor of Nova Scotia
 James W. Douglas (1851–1883), political figure in British Columbia
 James Postell Douglas (1836–1901), soldier, politician, and businessman in the state of Texas
 James Douglas (Australian politician) (died 1905), New South Wales colonial politician

Sportspeople
 Jimmy Douglas (American soccer) (1898–1972), goalkeeper 
 Jimmy Douglas (Canadian soccer) (born 1948), midfielder and coach
 James Douglas (cricketer) (1870–1958), English cricketer
 Jimmy Douglas (Scottish footballer) (1859–1919), Scottish international footballer
 Buster Douglas (James Douglas, born 1960), American boxer
 James Scott Douglas (1930–1969), British racing driver

Military
 James Douglas (English Army officer) (died 1691), Colonel of the Scots Regiment of Footguards, a regiment on the establishment of the English Army
 James H. Douglas Jr. (1899–1988), United States Secretary of the Air Force and United States Deputy Secretary of Defense
 Sir James Douglas, 1st Baronet (1703–1787), Commodore for Newfoundland and Labrador

Other
 James Douglas (antiquary) (1753–1819), English clergyman
 James Douglas (physician) (1675–1742), Scottish anatomist and physician
 James Douglas (businessman) (1837–1918), Canadian-born U.S. mining engineer, industrialist, and philanthropist
 James Douglas Jr. (1868–1949), Canadian-American businessman and mining executive
 James Douglas (composer) (1932–2022), Scottish composer
 James Douglas (journalist) (1867–1940), British newspaper editor, author and critic
 James Douglas (actor) (1929–2016), American soap opera actor
 James W. B. Douglas (died 1992), social researcher
 James Douglas (architect), American architect in Wisconsin
 James Douglas (judge) (born 1950), justice of the Supreme Court of Queensland
 Jim Douglas (guitarist) (born 1942), Scottish jazz guitarist

See also
 James Douglass (disambiguation)
 
 
 Jamie Douglas (disambiguation)